Hercules Computer Technology, Inc. was a manufacturer of computer peripherals for PCs and Macs founded in 1982.

History

Hercules was formed in 1982 in Hercules, California, by Van Suwannukul and Kevin Jenkins and was one of the major graphics card companies of the 1980s. Its biggest products were the MDA-compatible Hercules Graphics Card (HGC) and Hercules Graphics Card Plus (HGC+) and the associated standard, which was widely copied and survived into the 1990s.

The Hercules Graphics Card included a "Centronics compatible" parallel printer port, the same as the IBM Monochrome Display and Printer Adapter board that the card was based on. The company also produced CGA compatible cards, and with the unsuccessful Hercules InColor Card, it tried to go head-to-head with the Enhanced Graphics Adapter (EGA).

After low sales with InColor, Hercules stopped making its own graphics core and bought graphics chipsets from other manufacturers. The company name gradually declined through the 1990s while graphics chipsets firms such as Tseng Labs, S3 Graphics, 3Dfx, nVidia and ATI Technologies became popular, but Hercules sales of graphic cards were still at US$20 million in 1998. An acquisition of Hercules by German graphics card maker ELSA fell through in 1998 after the companies could not agree on terms.

Brand acquisition by Guillemot 
The Hercules brand was acquired by the French-Canadian based Guillemot Corporation for $1.8 million. In 2000 Hercules became the brand name for Guillemot 3D Prophet graphic cards, based on nVIDIA chipsets, switching to ATI Technologies chipsets in 2002.

Also in 2000, Guillemot introduced a new sound card, Game Theater XP, with the Hercules brand name, and Hercules gradually became the computer peripherals brand in Guillemot Corporation.

In 2004, Guillemot announced it would cease to produce graphics cards. Within the Guillemot group, computer peripherals (audio interfaces, speakers, webcams, networking) are designed by the Hercules division and given the Hercules brand, while game peripherals are designed by the Thrustmaster division and receive the Thrustmaster brand.

In 2010, the Hercules brand was used on computer speakers, computer DJ controllers, webcams and wireless networking peripherals.

Hercules turnover was €40.9 million (US$56.5 million) in 2010.

Organization
 Headquarters: in France (President: Claude Guillemot),
 Research and development: offices in Canada, France, Hong-Kong and Romania,
 Sales: via Guillemot sales branches in Belgium, France, Germany, Italy, Netherlands, Spain, UK, USA,
 Distribution to retailers: through distributors,
 Technical support: customer phone and email support by Guillemot technical support team.

Products

 Computer DJing: DJ Console – controllers with audio interface (DJ Console Mk2, Mk4, Rmx, 4-Mx) / DJ Control = DJ controllers without audio (DJ Control MP3, MP3 e2, Steel)
 Netbooks: eCafe ec-800, 900, 1000W, 1010W
 Speakers: XPS: Stereo, 2.1, for iPod and 5.1
 Webcams: DualPix: Classic, Infinite, Exchange, Emotion
 Networking: Wireless (WiFi) and ePlug (PowerLine)

Former products: Graphic cards
 Hercules based: Hercules Graphics Card (HGC), Hercules Graphics Card Plus (HGC+ with RAMFONT), Hercules InColor Card, Hercules Network Card Plus, Hercules Color Card 
 Tseng Labs based: Dynamite Pro
 Rendition based: Thriller 3D
 3Dfx based:    Stingray 128/3D 
 S3 based:      Terminator Professional, 64, Beast, Beast SuperCharged
 nVidia based:  Dynamite (before 1999) TNT, TNT2, TNT2 Ultra
 nVidia based:  Maxi Gamer Phoenix & Xentor (TNT, TNT2, Vanta)
 nVidia based:  3D Prophet (after 2000) DDR-DVI, 3D Prophet 2, 2-Mx, 2 Ultra, 3
 ATI based:     3D Prophet 7000, 7500, 8500, 9200, 9500, 9600, 9700
 ST Kyro based: 3D Prophet 4000, 4000XT, 4500

Former products: Sound cards
 DIGIFIRE 7.1
 Guillemot Maxi Sound Muse
 Hercules Gamesurround Muse Pocket USB
 Hercules Game Theater XP 6.1, 7.1
 Hercules Gamesurround Muse XL
 Hercules Gamesurround Muse LT
 Hercules Gamesurround Muse 5.1 DVD
 Hercules Gamesurround Fortissimo II Digital Edition
 Hercules Gamesurround Fortissimo III 7.1

References

External links 

 Hercules technical support
 Hercules hot line
 Hercules Company Website
 Hercules DJ Mix Room
 Hercules eCafe
 Hercules Sound cards

American companies established in 1982
American companies disestablished in 1998
Companies based in Fremont, California
Computer companies established in 1982
Computer companies disestablished in 1998
Defunct companies based in California
Defunct computer companies of the United States
Defunct computer hardware companies
Graphics hardware companies
Sound cards
Technology companies based in the San Francisco Bay Area